"¿Qué Hago Yo?" is a Latin pop song recorded by American duo Ha*Ash.  It was first included on Ha*Ash's second studio album Mundos Opuestos (2005) where it was released as the third single on March 6, 2006 and then included on their live albums Primera Fila: Hecho Realidad (2014) and Ha*Ash: En Vivo (2019). Colombian-American singer Soraya wrote the track.

Background and release 
"¿Qué Hago Yo?" was written by Soraya and produced by Áureo Baqueiro. Is a song recorded by American duo Ha*Ash from her second studio album "Mundos Opuestos" (2005) and then recorded live for his live album Primera Fila: Hecho Realidad in 2014. It was released as the third single from the album on March 6, 2006 by Sony Music Entertainment.

Commercial performance 
The track peaked at number 50 in the Latin Pop Songs charts in the United States. In Mexico, the song peaked at number 1 in the Monitor Latino, and 36 in the Mexican Singles Chart. On February 12, 2007, it was announced that ¿Qué Hago Yo? had been certified Platinum (rigtone).

Music video 
A music video for "¿Qué Hago Yo?" was released in March, 2006. Was published on her YouTube channel on April 24, 2010. It was directed by Leo Sánchez. , the video has over 189 million views on YouTube.

The second music video for "¿Qué Hago Yo?", recorded live for the live album Primera Fila: Hecho Realidad, was released on April 29, 2015. It was directed by Nahuel Lerena. The video was filmed in Estudios Churubusco, City Mexico. , the video has over 72 million views on YouTube.

The third video for "Me Entrego a Ti", recorded live for the live album Ha*Ash: En Vivo, was released on December 6, 2019. The video was filmed in Auditorio Nacional, Mexico City.

Credits and personnel 
Credits adapted from AllMusic and Genius.

Recording and management

 Recording Country: United States
 Sony / ATV Discos Music Publishing LLC / Westwood Publishing
 (P) 2005 Sony Music Entertainment México, S.A. De C.V.

Ha*Ash
 Ashley Grace  – vocals, guitar
 Hanna Nicole  – vocals, guitar 
Additional personnel
 Áureo Baqueiro  – recording engineer, arranger, director 
 Soraya  – songwriting.
 Gerardo García  – guitar, acoustic guitar, mandoline.
 Tommy Morgan  – harmonica.
 Gabe Witcher  – violin.

Charts

Certifications

Release history

References 

Ha*Ash songs
2006 songs
2006 singles
Songs written by Soraya (musician)
Song recordings produced by Áureo Baqueiro
Spanish-language songs
Pop ballads
Sony Music Latin singles
2000s ballads